Steinar Sverd Johnsen is a Norwegian keyboardist and composer, born 1972. Sverd plays keyboards and synthesizers in Arcturus and was also the main composer for the band. He formed the band with Jan Axel Blomberg (also known as Hellhammer) of Mayhem in 1987, originally under the moniker Mortem (where he played guitar). The band split up in April 2007, but reformed in 2011.

In 1998, Sverd was recruited by the band, The Kovenant, known at the time as Covenant, along with Hellhammer. After the release of the album Nexus Polaris, Sverd and the band parted ways.

Sverd has also been a guest on a few releases by prominent Norwegian black metal bands, Ulver and Satyricon.

Discography

With Mortem
 Slow Death (demo, 1989)
 Slow Death (EP, 1990)

With Arcturus
Promo 90 (Demo, 1990)
My Angel (EP, 1991)
Constellation (EP, 1994)Aspera Hiems Symfonia (full-length, 1995)La Masquerade Infernale (full-length, 1997)Disguised Masters (compilation, 1999)Aspera Hiems Symfonia/Constellation/My Angel (compilation, 2001)The Sham Mirrors (full-length, 2002)Sideshow Symphonies (full-length, 2005)Shipwrecked in Oslo (live film, 2006)Arcturian (full-length 2015)

 With Covenant Nexus Polaris (full-length, 1998)

 As a session musician 
Satyricon - The Shadowthrone (full-length, 1994) (credited as S.S.)
Ved Buens Ende - ...Coiled in Obscurity (compilation, 1995)

 As a guest musician 
Ulver - Bergtatt - Et Eeventyr i 5 Capitler (full-length, 1995)
Fleurety - Department of Apocalyptic Affairs'' - (full-length, 2000)

References

1972 births
Living people
Heavy metal keyboardists
Norwegian black metal musicians
Norwegian rock keyboardists
Rock pianists
Place of birth missing (living people)
Arcturus (band) members
The Kovenant members
21st-century pianists